Sun Chan is a U.S.-educated Hong Kong writer/director.

Education 
Chan graduated with a MA degree in Economics from Yale University.

Career 
Shortly after the theatrical release of his first feature film, Day of Redemption, more theaters had to be arranged to play the film in order to accommodate the audience.

Sun Chan also wrote and directed IQIYI's original series The Substitute. The show aired on November 29, 2015, on the Chinese streaming service iQIYI. It received 4,320,000 hits within 4 hours of release, and 200 million hits by the time episode 15 was released.

Prior to his creative ventures, Sun had studied Economics at Yale University and worked as a brand management specialist at Burson-Marsteller.

Chan is the Head of Development and Production at Palette Pictures.

External links

References

Hong Kong screenwriters
Living people
Year of birth missing (living people)
Hong Kong film directors
Chinese television directors
Place of birth missing (living people)
Yale Graduate School of Arts and Sciences alumni